Paul Boyer (1864 – 1 October 1949) was a French slavist.

He inaugurated the chair of Russian language at the Institut national des langues et civilisations orientales of Paris in 1891. The linguist  was among his students.

Main publications 
Manuel pour l'étude de la langue russe, textes accentués, commentaire grammatical, remarques diverses en appendice, lexique, avec Nikolaï Vasilevitch Speranskiĭ, Armand Colin, Paris, 1905 ; 1935 ; 1951 ; 1957 ; 1967 
Chez Tolstoï, entretiens à Iasnaïa Poliana, Institut d'études slaves de l'Université de Paris, Paris, 1950

External links 
 Paul Boyer on data.bnf.fr
 Discours prononcé sur la tombe de M. Alexis Rostand, président honoraire du Comptoir national d'escompte de Paris

Linguists from France
Slavists
1864 births
People from Indre-et-Loire
1949 deaths